The Subcommittee on Commercial and Administrative Law (CAL) is a former subcommittees of the United States House Committee on the Judiciary. It was incorporated into the Subcommittee on Courts, Commercial and Administrative Law during the 112th Congress.

Jurisdiction
From the House Rules: 
The Subcommittee on Commercial and Administrative Law shall have jurisdiction over the following subject matters: bankruptcy and commercial law, bankruptcy judgeships, administrative law, independent counsel, state taxation affecting interstate commerce, interstate compacts, other appropriate matters as referred by the Chairman, and relevant oversight.

Members, 111th Congress

See also
  United States House Committee on the Judiciary
  Administrative Procedure Act (United States)
  Administrative Law, Process and Procedure Project

References

External links 
Subcommittee Page

Judiciary House Commercial and Administrative Law
United States administrative law